Hog Island is an island in the wetlands of the Petaluma River in Sonoma County, California, located at  near the Marin County line. San Antonio Creek enters the river just west of this island. It is mentioned in a newspaper article from 1914.

There are two other islands with the same name in the Bay area: Hog Island, in Tomales Bay in Marin County, and Hog Island in the Sacramento–San Joaquin River Delta in San Joaquin County.

See also
 List of islands of California

References

External links

Islands of the San Francisco Bay Area
Islands of Northern California
Islands of Sonoma County, California